Owen's chameleon (Trioceros oweni), also commonly known as Owen's three-horned chameleon, is a species of lizard in the family Chamaeleonidae. The species is native to sub-Saharan Africa. Named after British naval officer and explorer William Fitzwilliam Owen, it was first described in 1831 by the naturalist John Edward Gray, and is the type species of the genus Trioceros.

Distribution and habitat
Owen's chameleon can be found in much of tropical sub-Saharan Africa, from the Niger Delta in Nigeria in the north, to Angola in the south, and Burundi in the east. The type locality for the species is the island of Bioko in Equatorial Guinea.

Description and behavior
Like many other chameleons, Owen's chameleon has a prehensile tail and a single claw on each toe. Males have three smooth horns, while females lack horns but have loose skin on their hind legs that gives the impression of wearing baggy trousers. The species is generally arboreal and will leap from branch to branch or to the ground in order to avoid predators; it tends to feed on insects.

Conservation and threats
Because of its wide range, abundance, and population stability, Owen's chameleon is ranked Least Concern by the International Union for Conservation of Nature. However, there are concerns that logging and agricultural expansion may contribute to deforestation and potentially threaten the status of the species. In addition, it is occasionally exploited via the pet trade or traded locally to be used in traditional medicine; some tribes in the Democratic Republic of the Congo believe that scorched body of an Owen's chameleon can be used as a protective talisman, while around Yaounde in Cameroon the species is utilized as a treatment for maladies believed to be magical.

References

Further reading
Boulenger GA (1887). Catalogue of the Lizards in the British Museum (Natural History). Second Edition. Volume III. ... Chamæleontidæ. London: Trustees of the British Museum (Natural History). (Taylor and Francis, printers). xii + 575 pp. + Plates I-XL. (Chamæleon owenii, p. 470).
Gray JE (1831). "Description of a new Chamaeleon discovered by Capt. Owen in Africa". Zoological Miscellany 1: 7. (Chameleo oweni, new species).
Nečas P (1999). Chameleons: Nature's hidden jewels. Frankfurt am Main, Germany: Edition Chimaira. 348 pp.  (Europe),  (USA, Canada).
Tilbury CR, Tolley KA (2009). "A re-appraisal of the systematics of the African genus Chamaeleo (Reptilia: Chamaeleonidae)". Zootaxa 2079: 57-68. (Trioceros oweni, new combination).

Owen's chameleon
Reptiles of Central Africa
Reptiles of Angola
Vertebrates of Burundi
Reptiles of Cameroon
Vertebrates of the Central African Republic
Reptiles of the Democratic Republic of the Congo
Reptiles of Equatorial Guinea
Reptiles of Gabon
Reptiles of the Republic of the Congo
Owen's chameleon
Taxa named by John Edward Gray